The Murchison Medal is an academic award established by Roderick Murchison, who died in 1871. First awarded in 1873, it is normally given to people who have made a significant contribution to geology by means of a substantial body of research and for contributions to 'hard' rock studies. One of the closing public acts of Murchison’s life was the founding of a chair of geology and mineralogy in the University of Edinburgh. Under his will there was established the Murchison Medal and geological fund (The Murchison Fund) to be awarded annually by the council of the Geological Society of London.

Murchison medalists 
Source:  Geological Society

See also

 List of geology awards
 List of awards named after people

References

Geology awards
Awards of the Geological Society of London
Awards established in 1873
British science and technology awards
1873 establishments in England